al-Qutayfah District is a district of the Rif Dimashq Governorate in southern Syria. Administrative centre is the city of al-Qutayfah. At the 2004 census, the district had a population of 119,283.

Sub-districts
The district of al-Qutayfah is divided into four sub-districts or nawāḥī (population as of 2004):

Localities in al-Qutayfah District
According to the Central Bureau of Statistics (CBS), the following villages, towns and cities make up the district of Al-Qutayfah:

References

 
Districts of Rif Dimashq Governorate